Muyu is a town of Qingchuan County, Sichuan, China. , it administers three residential neighborhoods and five villages:
Neighborhoods
Shiniu Community
Wenwu Community
Hongqi Community

Villages
Muyu Village
Tielu Village
Banqiao Village
Qianshan Village
Xinba Village

References

Towns in Sichuan
Qingchuan County